Aschalew Tamene Seyoum (born 22 November 1991) is an Ethiopian professional footballer who plays as a centre-back for Ethiopian Premier League club Fasil Kenema and the Ethiopia national team.

Career statistics
Scores and results list Ethiopia's goal tally first, score column indicates score after each Tamene goal.

References

1991 births
Living people
Ethiopian footballers
Association football midfielders
Ethiopia international footballers
Sportspeople from Southern Nations, Nationalities, and Peoples' Region
Saint George S.C. players
Fasil Kenema S.C. players
2016 African Nations Championship players
2021 Africa Cup of Nations players
Ethiopian Premier League players
Ethiopia A' international footballers
2022 African Nations Championship players